"Ready?" is Tomoko Kawase's third single as Tommy heavenly6. It was released on Jul 20, 2005, and peaked at #15 on the Oricon singles chart. It was her last single released for her debut album Tommy heavenly6.

Track listing

2005 singles
Tomoko Kawase songs
Songs written by Tomoko Kawase
2005 songs
Defstar Records singles